Béla Blum (1892 – 5 November 1957) was a Hungarian rower. He competed at the 1928 Summer Olympics in Amsterdam with the men's coxed four where they were eliminated in the round two repechage.

References

1892 births
1957 deaths
Hungarian male rowers
Olympic rowers of Hungary
Rowers at the 1928 Summer Olympics
Rowers from Budapest
European Rowing Championships medalists